DOF may stand for:

Science
 Depth of field, in photography a measurement of depth of acceptable sharpness in the object space, or subject space
 Depth of focus, in lens optics describes the tolerance of placement of the image plane to the lens
 Digital obstacle file, in aviation contains data on man-made obstacles
 2,5-Dimethoxy-4-fluoroamphetamine (DOF), a psychedelic drug.
 Distance-of-Flight, a mass spectrometry technology.
 Degrees of freedom, used in mechanics, statistics, as well as physics and chemistry.

Music
 Deeds of Flesh, a Death Metal band
 Deutsch-Österreichisches Feingefühl or DÖF, a 1980s Austrian-German Neue Deutsche Welle pop band.

Other
 Dansk Ornitologisk Forening, Danish Ornithological Society
 Department of Finance (Philippines), an executive department in the Philippines
 Department of Finance (Northern Ireland), a government department in Northern Ireland
 Diario Oficial de la Federación (Official Journal of the Federation), published by the Mexican government
 DOF ASA, company
 DOF Subsea, company
 Documento de Origem Florestal (Forest Origin Document), a governmental Brazilian system to regulation of extraction, transport and commerce of native forest products.
 Double old fashioned glass, a glass for serving "lowball" cocktails that is typically 12-16 fluid ounces (350-470ml)